999 is an extended play by Nigerian rapper Olamide. It was released on 9 February 2020 through YBNL Nation with music production credits to Pheelz, ID Cabasa, Eskeez, and others. The EP is a follow up to his 2018 collaborative Project YBNL Mafia.

Track listing

References

2020 EPs
Olamide albums
YBNL Nation albums